Louisiana Highway 40 (LA 40) is a state highway located in southeastern Louisiana.  It runs  in an east–west direction from LA 43 south of Montpelier to LA 41 in Bush.

The route travels through the rural area between the parallel corridors of U.S. Highway 190 (US 190) and LA 21 to the south and LA 16 to the north.  It connects several small population centers in Tangipahoa and St. Tammany parishes.  These include the town of Independence, the village of Folsom, and the unincorporated communities of Loranger and Bush.  LA 40 also connects Independence with Interstate 55 (I-55), the area's primary route to the New Orleans area.  Further east, the highway provides access to the Global Wildlife Center, a popular wildlife and game preserve located west of Folsom.

LA 40 was designated in the 1955 Louisiana Highway renumbering from portions of several former routes, primarily State Route 408, State Route 1080, and State Route 189.  Two portions of LA 40 are scheduled to be eliminated from the state highway system in the future as part of the Louisiana Department of Transportation and Development (La DOTD) Road Transfer Program.

Route description

Livingston Parish to Folsom
From the west, LA 40 begins at a junction with LA 43 between Montpelier and Albany in the northeast corner of Livingston.  The highway crosses into Tangipahoa Parish after a short distance and passes through an interchange with I-55 (exit 40) just west of Independence.  I-55 connects with Hammond, Louisiana to the south and Jackson, Mississippi to the north.  LA 40 heads into town and follows West 3rd Street to a junction with US 51 (West Railroad Avenue), which serves local traffic along the I-55 corridor.

Immediately after crossing US 51, LA 40 crosses the Canadian National Railway (CN) line at grade and zigzags south and east out of Independence.  The highway then crosses a bridge over the Tangipahoa River and intersects LA 1054.  In the community of Loranger, LA 40 turns south at a junction with LA 1062.  Over the next , the highway zigzags along section line roads but maintains a general eastward trajectory.  During this stretch are intersections with minor rural routes, such as LA 442, LA 443, and LA 445, which connect to more populated areas along US 51 and US 190.  Traveling through an area known as Uneedus, LA 40 passes the entrance to the Global Wildlife Center, a non-profit wildlife preserve open to the public.

Folsom to Bush
LA 40 crosses the Tchefuncte River into St. Tammany Parish and proceeds into the village of Folsom.  The highway follows Garfield Street to a junction with LA 25 (Orange Street) in the center of town, connecting with the cities of Covington and Franklinton.  LA 40 zigzags north onto LA 25 for two blocks before turning east onto Cleveland Street to exit the village.  The highway then follows a more winding path for the remainder of its journey.

Heading southeast from Folsom, LA 40 begins a concurrency with LA 437 that ends when the latter turns south onto Lee Road in a populated rural area north of Covington. Resuming its eastward course, LA 40 intersects two minor rural routes, LA 1082 and LA 1083. Near the end of its route, the highway makes a final zigzag via LA 21 in the unincorporated community of Bush. It then continues a short distance further to a T-intersection with LA 41, which turns north onto a divided-four lane alignment heading toward the city of Bogalusa.

Route classification and data
LA 40 is classified by the Louisiana Department of Transportation and Development (La DOTD) as a rural major collector west of Lee Road (LA 437 south) and as a rural minor collector between Lee Road and Bush.  Daily traffic volume in 2013 peaked at 11,700 vehicles in Folsom and 8,200 vehicles between I-55 and Independence.  The lowest figure was reported near the eastern terminus in Bush with an average of 1,460 vehicles daily.  The posted speed limit is generally  in rural areas, reduced as low as  through town.  LA 40 is an undivided two-lane highway for its entire length.

History
In the original Louisiana Highway system in use between 1921 and 1955, the modern LA 40 was part of several different routes, primarily State Route 408 from the western terminus to Loranger; State Route 1080 from Loranger to the Tangipahoa–St. Tammany parish line; and State Route 189 from the parish line to Bush. All three routes were added to the state highway system between 1928 and 1930. The next mile was taken into the system later as State Route C-2021. This provided a connection to Route 1080, which did exist, and completed a state-maintained route between Loranger and Tickfaw. Finally, the easternmost mile of LA 40 was actually a spur of State Route 484 created when State Route 7 (the modern LA 21) was straightened through Bush.

LA 40 was created in the 1955 Louisiana Highway renumbering, giving a single route number to the east–west corridor in Tangipahoa and St. Tammany parishes between LA 16 and US 190/LA 21.

With the 1955 renumbering, the state highway department initially categorized all routes into three classes: "A" (primary), "B" (secondary), and "C" (farm-to-market).  This system has since been updated and replaced by a more specific functional classification system.

The route has seen only minor changes over the years.  A small realignment occurred to accommodate the construction of the I-55 interchange west of Independence in 1969.  The original path of LA 40 here exists as two dead-end local roads on either side of the interstate called Fontana Lane and Old Highway 40.  Another realignment shifted the highway's zigzag in Folsom east two blocks, creating the concurrency with LA 25.  Originally, LA 40 turned north from Garfield Street onto Olive Street, then followed Cleveland Street straight across LA 25.

Future
Under this plan of "right-sizing" the state highway system, two portions of LA 40 are proposed for deletion as they no longer meet a significant interurban travel function. These include the portion from I-55 west of Independence to the junction with LA 442/LA 443 south of Loranger and the easternmost portion of the route between LA 21 and LA 41 in Bush.

Major intersections

See also

References

External links

Maps / GIS Data Homepage, Louisiana Department of Transportation and Development

0040
Transportation in Livingston Parish, Louisiana
Transportation in Tangipahoa Parish, Louisiana
Transportation in St. Tammany Parish, Louisiana